Lorenzo Annibale Costantino Nigra, Count of Villa Castelnuovo (11 June 1828 – 1 July 1907), was an Italian nobleman, philologist, poet, diplomat, and politician. Among his several positions he held and political and foreign affairs in which he was involved in the Kingdom of Piedmont and Kingdom of Italy, he served as ambassador and was later appointed a member of the Senate of the Kingdom of Italy.

Biography 

Nigra was born in Villa Castelnuovo, in the province of Turin, Piedmont. He graduated in jurisprudence at the University of Turin. During the Revolutions of 1848 in the Italian states, he interrupted his studies to serve as a volunteer against the Austrian Empire, and was wounded at the battle of Rivoli. On the conclusion of peace, he entered the Kingdom of Piedmont's foreign office; he accompanied King Victor Emmanuel II and Camillo Benso, Count of Cavour, to Paris and London in 1855. In 1856, he took part in the conference of Paris by which the Crimean War was brought to an end.

After the meeting at Plombières between Cavour and Napoleon III, Nigra was again sent to Paris, this time to popularize a Franco–Piedmontese alliance, Nigra being, as Cavour said, the only person perhaps who knows all my thoughts, even the most secret. He was instrumental in negotiating the marriage between Victor Emmanuel's daughter Clothilde and Napoleon's nephew, and during the Second Italian War of Independence in 1859 he was always with the emperor. He was recalled from Paris when the occupation of the Marche and Umbria by the Piedmontese caused a breach in Franco–Italian relations, and was appointed secretary of state to the prince of Carignano, viceroy of the Neapolitan provinces.

When Napoleon recognized the Kingdom of Italy in 1861, Nigra returned to France as minister-resident, and for many years played a most important part in political affairs and for Cavour; for his account of the administration of the Neapolitan provinces, Giustino Fortunato judged it an "admirable brave writing ... that is worth so much gold". During his mandate in Paris, Nigra contributed to the negotiations that led, thanks to the consent of Napoleon, to the conclusion of the Italo–Prussian alliance in 1866 ahead of the Third Italian War of Independence. In 1870, after his in the battle of Sedan, Napoleon was taken prisoner. As ambassador in Paris, Nigra remained the only friend of the empress Eugénie de Montijo, who was appointed regent. Since the people had risen proclaiming a republic, the French Third Republic, Nigra helped them escape and save themselves. Having become a friend of Virginia Oldoini, Countess of Castiglione, through Cavour, he was later her lover in Paris.

In 1876, Nigra was transferred to St. Petersburg with the rank of ambassador, in 1882 to London, and in 1885 to Vienna. In 1899, he represented Italy at the first Hague Peace Conference. He was created count in 1882 and senator in 1890. Having retired in 1904, he died at Rapallo on 1 July 1907. He was a sound classical scholar, and published translations of many Greek and Latin poems with valuable comments; he was also a poet and the author of several works of folklore and popular poetry, of which the most important is his Canti popolari del Piemonte. Shortly after Cavour's death in 1861, he was elected as Great Master of the Grand Orient of Italy. In February 1860, Nigra had joined the regular Masonic Lodge Ausonia of Turin.

Honuors

Italy 

  Knight of the Supreme Order of the Most Holy Annunciation, 1892.
  Grand Cordon of the Order of Saints Maurice and Lazarus, 1892.
  Knight Grand Cross of the Order of the Crown of Italy, 1892.

Foreign 
  Knight of the Imperial Order of Saint Alexander Nevsky, Russian Empire.
  Knight Grand Cross of the Royal Military Order of Our Lord Jesus Christ, Kingdom of Portugal.
  Knight Grand Star of the Order of the Lion and the Sun, Qajar Empire.
  Knight Class I of the Order of the Iron Crown, Austro–Hungarian Empire.
  Grand Official of the National Order of the Legion of Honour, Second French Empire.
  Commander of the Order of Isabella the Catholic, Kingdom of Spain.
  Knight IV Class of the Order of the Red Eagle, German Empire.
  Knight II Class of the Order of the Dannebrog, Kingdom of Denmark.

Honourary degrees 
  Honourary degree for studies in literature and applied philology, related to the collection of popular songs, University of Edinburgh.
  Honourary degree for studies in literature and applied philology, related to the collection of popular songs, University of Kraków.

Works 

Nigra's work included La rassegna di Novara (1861), published in 1875; La gondola Veneziana (barcarola) (1863); Le reliquie Celtiche (1872);
Canti popolari del Piemonte in 1888; La chioma di Berenice (Callimaco), a 1891 elegy by Callimachus with text in Latin by Catullus; Inni di Callimaco su Diana e sui lavacri di Pallade, a 1892 translation, review, and commentary of Callimachus; and Idillii (1903). He collaborated with Italian and French academies, and Italian, French, and German philological journals. On 13 December 1883, he became National Correspondent for the Philology category of the Moral Sciences Class of the Accademia dei Lincei.

References

Bibliography

Further reading

External links 
 
 Costantino Nigra at Accademia delle Scienze di Torino (in Italian)
 Costantino Nigra at Archivio storico Ricordi (in Italian)
 Costantino Nigra at Open Library (in English)
 Costantino Nigra at Tiscali (in Italian)
 Costantino Nigra at Treccani (in Italian)
 Costantino Nigra, politico e letterato at Storico.org (in Italian)
 Nigra, C. (1828–1907) at Persée (in French)
 Nigra, Costantino at Dizionario Biografico degli Italiani (in Italian) by Umberto Levra, Vol. 78, 2013
 Nigra, Costantino at Dizionario di storia (in Italian), 2010
 Nigra, Costantino at Enciclopedia Italiana (in Italian) by Mario Mengini and Vittorio Santoli, 1934
 Nigra, Costantino at Openmlol (in Italian)
 Nigra, Costantino at Sapere.it (in Italian)
 Nigra Costantino at Senatori Italiani (in Italian)
 Nigra, Costantino at L'Unificazione (in Italian), 2011

1828 births
1907 deaths
19th-century Italian diplomats
19th-century Italian poets
19th-century Italian politicians
Ambassadors of Italy to Austria-Hungary
Ambassadors of Italy to France
Ambassadors of Italy to Russia
Ambassadors of Italy to the United Kingdom
Folklorists
Italian nobility
People from Castelnuovo Nigra